Guanyinge may refer to the following locations in China:

Towns
 Guanyinge, Xupu, in Xupu County, Hunan
 Guanyinge, Guangdong, in Boluo County

Township(s)
 Guanyinge Township, Guanyang County, Guangxi

Subdistricts
 Guanyinge Subdistrict, Beizhen, Liaoning
 Guanyinge Subdistrict, Benxi County, Liaoning
 Guanyinge Subdistrict, Jining, in Shizhong District, Jining, Shandong